"Hot Summer" is a song by German pop group Monrose. It was written and produced by Danish musicians Remee Sigvardt and Thomas Troelsen and recorded by the trio for their second studio album, Strictly Physical (2007). A dance-pop song with heavy elements of electropop, house and sprechgesang, it was selected out of sereral hundreds of songs and set much of the tone of its parent album, which was chiefly produced by Remee and Troelsen. "Hot Summer" also introduced a stronger dance pop edge to Monrose's overall sound. Lyrically, it features a female protagonist expressing her desire for her love interest.

Released as the band's third single and  Strictly Physicals leading single on 29 June 2007 in German-speaking Europe, "Hot Summer" became the band's second non-consecutive number-one hit within a stretch of seven month, reaching the top of the charts of Austria, Germany, and Switzerland. It eventually emerged as one of the biggest-selling songs of the year on German online music stores, and moreover, garnered the group success in Finland, the Netherlands, and Slovenia, where it served as the band's musical debut. For sales in excess of 150,000 copies, "Hot Summer" was certified gold in Austria and Germany.

Background and recording

"Hot Summer" was written and produced by Danish musicians Remee Sigvardt Jackman and Thomas Troelsen. It is one out of several songs they contributed to Monrose's second album, Strictly Physical (2007), and marked one of their first songs as a collaborative duo. Much of it was created at the Delta Lab White recording studios in Copenhagen, Denmark in fall 2006. Remee also provided backing vocals and rap parts on the song, while Troelsen played keyboards and oversaw the programming of "Hot Summer". Vocals by Monrose members Mandy Capristo, Senna Gammour, and Bahar Kizil were eventually recorded by Claus Üblacker at the Weryton Studios in Munich, Germany.

The song was selected out of a total of three hundred songs for inclusion on Strictly Physical (2007). Monrose cited its uptempo nature as a reason for their selection and described it as a perfect "good mood song." An instant favorite of the band, "Hot Summer" was eventually picked as the lead single from Strictly Physical since they considered it a fitting break away from the ballad stereotype that they had established with the release of their singles "Shame" and "Even Heaven Cries". Band member Senna Gammour further elaborated in an interview with the band's official website: "The song is cool and sexy and goes straight into your dancing legs, [it's] our contribution to great summer parties." She also discussed the 1980s influences and house music elements of the record. Mandy Capristo called the song a "promise" and added: "It instantly raises your spirits, no matter if you're sitting in your car, dancing on the floor or eating ice-cream — "Hot Summer" is just brimful of life."

Release and reception 
"Hot Summer" received a generally positive reception from music critics who complimented the song for its hit qualities as well as Monrose's decision to break away from the pop sound of previous releases. Julia Dörfler from laut.de wrote that it "clearly has hit qualities." Similarly, music magazine Musikwoche declared the song a "summer hit." In his review for cdstarts.de, Albert Ranner compared it favorably to Canadian singer Nelly Furtado's "Maneater" (2006). He called the record "extremly danceable."

Although a twenty-second clip of "Hot Summer" was previewed on the ProSieben network's daily gossip television magazine taff on 24 May 2007, the full song was not premiered until Monrose's performance during the season finale of the second cycle of Germany's Next Topmodel a few hours later. Officially released on 29 June 2007, both the CD single as well as the digital single contained remixes by British-born DJ Tai Jason, Tomas Schmidt and Zafer Kurus from production team Beathoavenz, Patrick Flo Macheck of production team Mozart & Friends and German trio Nachtwandler, consisting of Christoph Riebling, Jens Klingelhöfer, and Patrick Ruhrmann. In addition, previously unreleased recording "Scream", written by Charlie Mason, Karl Johan Rasma, Pelle Lidell, and Sebastian Larsson, was included on the CD single.

Chart performance 
In Germany, "Hot Summer" debuted at number two on the German Singles Chart — behind German singer Mark Medlock's "You Can Get It", which was released the same week. The songs switched places the following week, when "Hot Summer" became Monrose's second number-one hit within a period of seven months. This marked the first time since the No Angels's rendition of "There Must Be an Angel" (2001) that a Popstars winner was able to score a second number-one hit. "Hot Summer" remained eight weeks within the top ten and also reached the top of the Download Chart as well as number eight on the German Dance Chart. One of the biggest-selling songs of the year on German online music stores, it was eventually certified gold by the Bundesverband Musikindustrie (BVMI) for sales in excess of 150,000 copies. In Germany, "Hot Summer" sold over 200,000 copies and was ranked 15th among the highest-selling singles of the year.

In Austria, "Hot Summer" debuted straight atop the Austrian Singles Chart. Monrose's second chart topper following 2006's "Shame", the song spent another three weeks at number-one. A major seller, it was awarded a gold certification by the International Federation of the Phonographic Industry (IFPI) Austria, and was ranked tenth on Austria's year end list. In Switzerland, "Hot Summer" entered the Swiss Singles Chart at number twelve in the week of 12 July 2007. It was not until its fifth week of release that the song also reached number one, also becoming Monrose's second single to do so. It spent a second consecutive week at the top of the chart and was ranked 16th on the national year end chart. Due to its major success all over German-speaking Europe, "Hot Summer" was also released in foreign music markets such as Belgium, Denmark, Finland, Italy, the Netherlands, Norway, Turkey, as well as most of Eastern Europe. Thus, it also entered the Dutch Top 40 and spent one week on the Finnish Singles Chart, peaking at number 19. "Hot Summer" also entered the top 30 of the Slovenian Airplay Chart, and peaked at number six on Billboards European Hot 100 Singles.

Music video

An accompanying music video for "Hot Summer" was directed by Bernard Wedig and shot on 18 June 2007 in Berlin. Production was helmed by Schuhwerk Filmproduktion. A performance video that is built around different settings, it is primarily composed of individual close shots and dance sequences using split screen and bluescreen technique. It premiered on 26 June 2007 on the band's official website, and received its first official airing on German music television network VIVA's show VIVA Live on 28 June 2007.

The video does not have a substantial plot. Instead, the band is primarily shown dancing in front of white, black, blue and red backgrounds, intercut by several sequences of three male dancers. The camera work is hectic. In the middle of the video the black bars that appear on a 4:3 television at the top and bottom of the screen are displayed as video footage. The group members are able to interact with these bars and climb outside the screen. The version used in the video is different from the album version (aka radio edit) featuring a longer intro and an extended bridge featuring additional lyrics. Media sources compared it with Dolce & Gabbana's 2006 television commercial "Dancefloor."

Track listings

Credits and personnel
Credits adapted from the liner notes of Strictly Physical.

Mandy Capristo – vocals 
Senna Gammour – vocals 
Bahar Kizil – vocals 

Remee – backing vocals, production, writing
Thomas Troelsen – keyboard, production, programming, writing
Claus Üblacker – vocal recording

Charts

Weekly charts

Year-end charts

Certifications

Release history

f(x) version

In 2011, South Korean girl group f(x) recorded the song in Korean and Japanese. The Korean version was released on 14 June 2011 in South Korea, serving as the lead single from the re-packaged version of their debut album, Pinocchio. On 4 August 2012, the group released a Japanese version. The single was re-released in their first Japanese single called Summer Special: Pinocchio / Hot Summer on 22 July 2015.

The group performed the song live on KBS' Music Bank on 17 June 2011. They also performed on MBC's Music Core, SBS's Inkigayo and M-Countdown.  Hot Summer managed to win an award on SBS's Inkigayo on 26 June 2011.  The song was also performed as part of SMTown '10 and SMTown '12.

Music video

Korean version
The video was shot at two different locations, in Namyangju and Incheon in early June 2011.  It was directed by Won Ki Hong and produced by Zanybros. A teaser was released on 13 June 2011 and with the full version was released on 17 June 2011.

The video is a dance video without a plot, and begins with the group walking in the middle of the street, donning brightly colored outfits with a pink and black striped tank and several sports cars in the background. They are joined by a group of backup dancers. The video cuts to a white, red-floored room, with the group wearing red outfits. The video ends with the group posing in the street.

Japanese version
A teaser video for the video was released on 1 August 2012, via Avex's official YouTube channel. The full video subsequently appeared online a few days later on 31 July 2012.

The video is set in a desert, with pink and white star shaped props and pink cotton candy as clouds in the background. The video begins with the group wearing all white, walking slowly towards the camera.  The video then cuts to another set with close-up shots of the group revealing electric blue outfits, topped with elaborate accessories. A street scene is also featured, where the group wears red outfits in front of the star-shaped prop while throwing paint over the buildings and at the camera. The video ends with the desert as the camera pans back.

Commercial performance
The Korean version was a commercial success, peaking at number two on the Gaon digital single chart, recording over 375,000 downloads during its release week.  It debuted at number five,  then moved up to its peak and fell to number four. Hot Summer also ranked highly among Gaon's other charts, peaking at number two on the BGM chart. and number one on the streaming chart.   The song was the 16th most successful digital song of 2011 in South Korea, selling 2,909,384 copies by the end of the year.

Charts

Accolades

Music program awards

Credits 
Credits adapted from EP's liner notes.

Studio 
 SM Concert Hall Studio – recording, mixing, digital editing
 SM Blue Cup Studio – recording
 4B Studio – recording
 Sonic Korea – mastering

Personnel 

 SM Entertainment – executive producer
 Lee Soo-man – producer
 Kim Young-min – executive supervisor
 f(x) – vocals, background vocals
 Thomas Troelsen – composition
 Remee – composition
 Kenzie – Korean lyrics, arrangement, vocal directing, background vocals
 Kanata Okajima – Japanese lyrics
 Nam Koong-jin – recording, mixing, digital editing
 Lee Jin-yong – recording
 Jung Eui-seok – recording
 Jeon Hoon – mastering

Other versions

"Hot Summer"
In 2008, Rhys Bobridge, runner-up on the inaugural season of So You Think You Can Dance Australia 2008, recorded the song with altered lyrics. It was released as a single and reached number 39 on the Australian Singles Chart in December 2008, as well as number 45 on the Dutch Single Top 100 chart in September 2009. His version was featured on various Channel Ten promotional advertisements, and advertised upcoming shows on the network over the summer period in Australia, as well as on radio by the Today Network. Taiwanese pop singer Jolin Tsai covered the song under the title "Hot Winter" for the 2009 album Butterfly.

"Scream"
In 2007, the single's B-side was covered in Korean as "Daydream" by supergroup AnyBand, consisting of BoA, Xiah Junsu, Tablo and Jin Bora.  The song was also covered by Korean singer BoA's self-titled English debut album BoA (2009).

References

2007 songs
2007 singles
Monrose songs
Dance-pop songs
Number-one singles in Austria
Number-one singles in Germany
Number-one singles in Switzerland
Songs written by Thomas Troelsen
Songs written by Remee
Warner Music Group singles
2011 singles
F(x) (group) songs
SM Entertainment singles
Songs written by Kenzie (songwriter)